Thomas Heilman (born February 7, 2007) is an American competitive swimmer. He is a world junior record holder in the long course 4×100 meter freestyle relay. He is also a 2022 Junior Pan Pacific Championships gold medalist in the 100 meter butterfly, 4×100 meter freestyle relay, and 4×100 meter medley relay, and a silver medalist in the 100 meter freestyle, 200 meter butterfly, and 4×200 meter freestyle relay.

Background
Heilman attends Western Albemarle High School in Crozet, Virginia and trains with the swim club Cavalier Aquatics. He has an older brother, Matthew, who is a competitive swimmer as well.

Career

2021–2022
By the start of 2022, Heilman had amassed over ten National Age Group records, fastest times ever swum by an American swimmer under 18 years of age and bracketed into age groups, including setting a record of 53.27 seconds in the 100 meter butterfly, which broke the former record that had been set by Michael Andrew. In December of 2021 alone, he set fourteen National Age Group records in a time span of 11 days. At the 2022 USA Swimming International Team Trials, held in Greensboro, North Carolina, he qualified for the United States roster for the 2022 Junior Pan Pacific Swimming Championships in the 50 meter freestyle, 100 meter butterfly, and 200 meter butterfly. Following his addition to the team roster, he was announced as a nominee for the "Boys Rising Star of the Year", a High School Sports Award by USA Today. The following month, in August at the 2022 Junior National Championships, he won the 100 meter freestyle with a time that made him the first 15-year-old male American swimmer in history to swim the race faster than 50 seconds.

2022 Junior Pan Pacific Championships

The first day of competition at the 2022 Junior Pan Pacific Swimming Championships, contested in Honolulu at the Veterans Memorial Aquatic Center, Heilman won the silver medal in the 200 meter butterfly with a personal best time of 1:56.52, which ranked him as the fourth-fastest American 15 to 16 years of age in history in the event, behind Michael Phelps, Luca Urlando, and Andrew Seliskar. The second day, he ranked first in the preliminaries of the 100 meter freestyle with a personal best time of 49.06 seconds. His time set a new National Age Group record for the boys 15-16 age group, lowering the former mark set by Caeleb Dressel in 2013 at 49.28 seconds by over two-tenths of a second. In the evening final, he won the silver medal with a time of 49.34 seconds, finishing 1.11 seconds behind gold medalist Flynn Southam of Australia. The start of the race was delayed from the initially set start time due to heavy rain, competition was conducted at an outdoor pool. With a split of 1:47.98 for the second leg of the 4×200 meter freestyle relay later in the same finals session, he helped win the silver medal in a time of 7:15.18.

On the third morning, Heilman swam a 52.75 in the preliminary heats of the 100 meter butterfly, qualifying for the final ranking second behind Jesse Coleman of Australia. He edged out Jesse Coleman in the final by 0.25 seconds to win the gold medal in a Championships record and personal best time of 51.98 seconds. His time marked the fastest time ever swum by a male American swimmer in the 15–16 age group, lowering the former National Age Group record of 52.40 set by Luca Urlando. Later in the session, he led-off the 4×100 meter freestyle relay with a 49.14 to help win the gold medal in a world junior record and Championships record time of 3:15.79. Sprinting to a finish in a time of 23.05 seconds in the preliminary heats of the 50 meter freestyle on the fourth and final day, he qualified for the b-final ranking first, 0.17 seconds ahead of fellow American and second-ranked Daniel Diehl. He withdrew from competing in the b-final prior to the start of the race. Splitting a 51.71 for the butterfly portion of the 4×100 meter medley relay, he contributed to a new Championships record of and gold medal-win in 3:36.65.

2022 Swimming World Cup
For his first FINA Swimming World Cup, Heilman chose a home-country debut, entering to compete in the 100 meter freestyle, 200 meter freestyle, and the 50 meter, 100 meter, and 200 meter butterfly events at the 2022 Swimming World Cup in Indianapolis. Day one of three, he placed eighteenth in the morning preliminary heats of the 100 meter butterfly with a personal best time of 51.68 seconds, not qualifying for the evening final. The second day, he started off with a rank of twenty-second in the 100 meter freestyle with a personal best time of 48.32 seconds, which was 0.05 seconds behind twenty-first ranked fellow American Hunter Armstrong and 1.71 seconds behind first ranked Kyle Chalmers of Australia. Later in the same session, he ranked twelfth in the preliminary heats of the 200 meter butterfly, 4.40 seconds slower than first ranked fellow American Trenton Julian with a personal best time of 1:55.44.

On the third and final day, Heilman placed thirteenth in the 50 meter butterfly with a personal best time of 23.34 seconds, which was 0.40 seconds behind eighth-rank final qualifier Matthew Temple of Australia. Later in the morning, he placed thirty-second in the 200 meter freestyle with a personal best time of 1:48.75.

2022 Winter Junior National Championships
Day two of the East edition of the 2022 Winter Junior US National Championships, held in December in Greensboro, Heilman won the 200 yard individual medley with a boys 15–16 National Age Group record time of 1:41.71. The following day, he won the 100 yard butterfly with a boys 15–16 National Age Group record time of 44.67 seconds that was almost one second faster than the former record of 45.62 seconds set by Luca Urlando approximately four years earlier. He finished his individual events off with a National Age Group record for the same age group on day four of four, this time winning the 200 yard butterfly and lowering the former record of 1:40.91 from Luca Urlando by 0.05 seconds with a personal best time of 1:40.86.

2023
Competing at the 2023 Virginia High School Class 4 State Championships in February as a sophomore, Heilman won individual titles in the 50 yard freestyle, with a 19.69, and the 100 yard butterfly, with a 46.06, which contributed to a win for the men's team of his school Western Albemarle. In March, he lowered his personal best time in the 100 yard freestyle to a 42.61 from his former personal best of 42.96 attained on a relay lead-off leg at the 2022 Winter Junior National Championships.

International championships

Personal best times

Long course meters (50 m pool)

Short course meters (25 m pool)

Legend: h – preliminary heat

Short course yards (25 yd pool)

World records

World junior records

Long course meters (50 m pool)

Awards and honors
 USA Today, High School Sports Awards, Boys Rising Star of the Year, nominee: 2021–2022

References

External links
 

2007 births
Living people
Swimmers from Virginia
American male butterfly swimmers
American male freestyle swimmers
American male medley swimmers
21st-century American people